U of M is an abbreviation that can refer to any of several universities:

In the United States
 University of Maine
 University of Maryland
 University of Massachusetts
 University of Memphis
 University of Miami
 University of Michigan
 University of Minnesota
 University of Mississippi
 University of Montana

In other countries
 University of Melbourne, Australia 
 Universidad de Mendoza, Argentina
 University of Manitoba, Canada 
 University of Montreal, Canada 
 State University of Malang, Indonesia
 University of Mashhad, Iran
 University of Macau, Macau
 University of Malaya, Malaysia
 University of Malta, Malta
 University of Mauritius, Mauritius
 Maputo University, Mozambique
 Maastricht University, Netherlands
 University of Manila, Philippines
 University of Mindanao, Philippines
 Universidade do Minho, Portugal
 University of Murcia, Spain
 University of Manchester, UK

See also
 UdeM (disambiguation)
 UM (disambiguation)
 MU (disambiguation)

References